Sphragisticus nebulosus is a species of dirt-colored seed bug in the family Rhyparochromidae, found in North America, Europe, and Asia.

References

External links

 

Rhyparochromidae